Sânnicolau Român is a commune located in Bihor County, Crișana, Romania. It is composed of three villages: Berechiu (Felsőbarakony), Roit (Rojt), and Sânnicolau Român. These were part of Cefa Commune until 2003, when they were split off.

The commune is located in the western part of Bihor County,  from the county seat, Oradea, on the border with Hungary. It lies on the banks of the Criș Collector Canal.

Natives
Claudiu Petrila (born 2000), footballer

References

Communes in Bihor County
Localities in Crișana